Katryna is a feminine given name variant of Katrina. Notable people with the name include:

 Katryna Gaither (born 1975), American basketball player
 Katryna Nields, American musical artist

Feminine given names